The Cars were an American rock band who recorded 89 songs during their career, of which included 86 originals and 3 covers. Emerging from the new wave scene in the late 1970s, the group consisted of singer, rhythm guitarist, and songwriter Ric Ocasek, bassist and singer Benjamin Orr, lead guitarist Elliot Easton, keyboardist Greg Hawkes, and drummer David Robinson.

Songs

Notes

References

Cars, The